KBWG-LP is a Variety formatted broadcast radio station licensed to and serving Browning, Montana.  KBWG-LP is owned and operated by the Blackfeet Tribe.

References

External links
 Thunder Radio on Facebook
 

2010 establishments in Montana
Variety radio stations in the United States
Radio stations established in 2010
BWG-LP
BWG-LP